Platon Gregoriewitch Brounoff (born 10 May 1859, Yelisavetgrad, Russian Empire; d. 11 July 1924, New York, United States) was a conductor, arranger and composer of Yiddish music.
He graduated at the St. Petersburg Imperial Conservatory, where he studied under Anton Rubinstein.

In July 1891, he immigrated to the United States, first residing in La Porte, Indiana, and then in New Haven, Connecticut (where he gave his first American concert), before settling in New York.

Selected works 
 1897: In The Flower Garden
 1899: In the Russian Village
 1911: 50 Jewish Folk Songs For Middle Voice And Piano Accompaniment Collected, Harmonized And Arranged By Platon Brounoff

References

External links 
 50 Jewish Folk Songs For Middle Voice And Piano Accompaniment Collected, Harmonized And Arranged By Platon Brounoff at the German National Library (Deutsche Nationalbibliothek) - click on "Archivobjekt öffnen" for free download

1859 births
1924 deaths